Harry James Birx (born June 1, 1941 in Canandaigua, New York), is an American anthropologist and a professor of Anthropology at Canisius College in Buffalo, New York. He is a distinguished research scholar at the State University of New York at Geneseo.

Life
Birx spent his childhood on the combination farm and travelers motel operated by his parents in the small town of Bloomfield in the Finger Lakes Region of New York. Graduating from Bloomfield Central High School in 1959, Birx completed his undergraduate studies at the nearby SUNY Geneseo before moving on to complete his M.A. in anthropology and his Ph.D. in philosophy, both from the SUNY Buffalo. 

As of 2019, he currently serves as a full professor of anthropology at Canisius College, where he lectures on anthropology in film and early biological anthropology. He is also a distinguished research scholar in the SUNY Geneseo's Department of Anthropology and he regularly holds a winter semester course entitled "Human Culture and Evolution" for the doctoral program of the University of Belgrade in Serbia. He has been a visiting professor at the Friedrich Schiller University of Jena, twice a visiting scholar at Harvard University, and has lectured at universities around the world. He received the 2003 Professional Achievement Award from the State University of New York at Geneseo.

Birx has written eight books and edited six more, and is the editor of the five-volume Encyclopedia of Anthropology (2006). He is also the editor of the World Lecture Series in Anthropology.

Honors
 Dr. H. James Birx Scholarship, State University of New York College of Arts and Sciences at Geneseo

Books
Theories of Evolution, Charles C Thomas Pub Ltd, 1984. 
Craniometry of the Orchid Site Ossuary Buffalo, Persimmon Press, 1991. 
Interpreting Evolution, Prometheus Books, 1991. 
Science and Society, Russian Academy of Sciences St. Petersburg, State University St. Petersburg, Russia, 2000
Advances in Evolution & Paleontology, University of Zaragoza, Spain, 2001. 
Values, Society & Evolution, Legend Books, 2002.

Dissertation
Pierre Teilhard de Chardin's Philosophy of Evolution, State University of New York at Buffalo, 1971. (author named as Birx, Harry James). 267 pages.

References

External links
Website at Canisius College

1941 births
Living people
American anthropologists
Canisius College faculty
Harvard University staff
Cultural anthropologists
Physical anthropologists
University at Buffalo alumni